William Yosses (born about 1952) is an American chef who is best known as co-author of the book Desserts For Dummies and for being the White House Executive Pastry Chef from 2007 to 2014. Yosses is now the owner of the pastry company Perfect Pie, which is based in New York City.

Career
Yosses served apprenticeships in France, and also worked under Chef Patrice Boely and Sous Chef Daniel Boulud at The Polo Restaurant in New York City. He earned his A.A.S. degree at the New York City College of Technology in Hotel Management, a Master of Arts at Rutgers University in French Language and Literature and a Bachelor of Arts at the University of Toledo in French Language.

Yosses is the successor to Thaddeus DuBois who left the same position in 2006. He served as a White House Holiday Pastry Chef for the 2006 holiday season. His most recent project has been to assist in the opening of Paul Newman's Dressing Room in Westport, Connecticut-a restaurant utilizing locally grown, artisanal and organic food sources. Other Executive Pastry Chef experience includes Josephs Citarella in New York City; planning, designing and opening the pastry department of Bouley Restaurant and Bakery and operating the pastry department of the Tavern on the Green Restaurant in New York City. Mr. Yosses was also Pastry Chef at Montrachet Restaurant in New York City.

President Barack Obama says of Yosses, "Whatever pie you like, he will make it and it will be the best pie you have ever eaten." Obama has also nicknamed Yosses "the Crust Master".

Yosses resigned from his White House position in June 2014. Yosses left his position to work on a new project focusing on "food literacy" by teaching young children and adults about eating better. The New York Times lede used the hook that Michelle Obama is "partly to blame" for her requests that Yosses make healthier food in smaller portions, but then went on to explain that this is because he found her to be "an inspiring boss," and his new project expands on the First Lady's  Healthy Foods Initiative. He began replacing butter with fruit puree and sugar with honey and agave but stated, "I don't want to demonize cream, butter, sugar and eggs." Yosses called the departure "a bittersweet decision." In response to claims that he was leaving because of the First Lady's demands, Yosses clearly stated, "Not at all, no. We work together on improving — making desserts more delicious and more healthy. We're partners on that project." He recounts his experiences working in the White House in West Wingers: Stories from the Dream Chasers, Change Makers, and Hope Creators Inside the Obama White House, a collection of personal accounts by Obama Administration staffers.

Yosses was the owner of the pastry company "Perfect Pie" based in New York City, which closed down in early 2020.

Books 

 
 The Perfect Finish: Special Desserts for Every Occasion. New York: Norton, 2010. Co-written with Melissa Clark.
 The Sweet Spot: Dialing Back Sugar and Amping Up Flavor. New York: Avery, 2017. Co-written with Peter Kaminsky.
 West Wingers: Stories from the Dream Chasers, Change Makers, and Hope Creators Inside the Obama White House. New York: Penguin, 2018. Contributed a chapter on his experiences working in the White House, especially during the Obama Administration.

See also
 List of pastry chefs

References

External links
White House press release about William Yosses''

Living people
Gay men
Pastry chefs
University of Toledo alumni
City University of New York alumni
Rutgers University alumni
1952 births
White House Executive Chefs